Aïn Oussera District is a district of Djelfa Province, Algeria.

Municipalities
The district is further divided into 2 municipalities:

Aïn Oussera
Guernini

Districts of Djelfa Province